Szarbków  is a village in the administrative district of Gmina Pińczów, within Pińczów County, Świętokrzyskie Voivodeship, in south-central Poland.

References

Villages in Pińczów County